KMTE-LP (99.1 FM) is a radio station licensed to Montrose, Colorado, United States.  The station is currently owned by State of Colorado Telecommunication Services.

References

External links
 

Radio stations in Colorado
Low-power FM radio stations in Colorado